The 1953 Prairie View A&M Panthers football team was an American football team that represented Prairie View A&M University in the Southwestern Athletic Conference (SWAC) during the 1953 college football season. In their fifth season under head coach Billy Nicks, the Panthers compiled a perfect 12–0 record, won the SWAC championship, and outscored opponents by a total of 387 to 88. The Panthers were recognized as the 1953 black college national champion.

Schedule

References

Prairie View AandM
Prairie View A&M Panthers football seasons
Black college football national champions
Southwestern Athletic Conference football champion seasons
College football undefeated seasons
Prairie View AandM Football